11 Tracks of Whack is the first solo album by Steely Dan co-founder Walter Becker, released in 1994. It was his third collaboration since 1980 with Steely Dan partner Donald Fagen, who produced the album, after Becker produced Fagen's Kamakiriad (1993), and Becker and Fagen played on Rosie Vela's debut album Zazu (1986).

Track listing
All songs written and composed by Walter Becker except "Cringemaker" which was co-written by Dean Parks. Horn and rhythm arrangements were written by Donald Fagen.

Personnel
Walter Becker – bass, guitar, ukulele, vocals
Dean Parks – acoustic guitar, electric guitar
Adam Rogers – electric guitar
John Beasley – keyboards
Donald Fagen – keyboards
Fima Ephron – bass
Ben Perowsky – drums
Paulinho Da Costa – percussion
Bob Sheppard – saxophone, woodwinds
Bruce Paulson – trombone
Jon Papenbrook – horns/brass
Catherine Russell – background vocals
Brenda White-King – background vocals

Production
Producer: Donald Fagen, Walter Becker
Engineers: Tom Hardisty, Earl Martin, John Neff, Roger Nichols, David Russell
Mixing: Roger Nichols, David Russell
Mastering: Glenn Meadows
Tech support: Craig Siegel
Project coordinator: Linda Starr
Art direction: Mick Haggerty
Type design: Mick Haggerty, Kathleen Philpott
Photography: Annalisa

References 

Walter Becker albums
1994 debut albums
Giant Records (Warner) albums
Albums produced by Donald Fagen
Albums produced by Walter Becker